This is a list of civil parishes in the ceremonial county of Nottinghamshire, England. There are 234 civil parishes in 8 districts.

Ashfield
Ashfield district: The former Hucknall Urban District, Kirkby in Ashfield Urban District and Sutton in Ashfield Urban District are unparished.

Annesley 2
Felley  2
Selston  2

Bassetlaw

Bassetlaw district: The former East Retford Municipal Borough and part of the former Worksop Municipal Borough are unparished.

Askham 7
Babworth 7
Barnby Moor 7
Beckingham 7
Bevercotes 7
Blyth 21
Bole 7
Bothamsall 7
Carburton 21
Carlton in Lindrick 21
Clarborough and Welham 7 
Clayworth 7
Clumber and Hardwick 20
Cottam 7
Darlton 7
Dunham-on-Trent 7
East Drayton 7
East Markham 7
Eaton 7
Elkesley 7
Everton 7
Fledborough 7
Gamston 7
Gringley on the Hill 7
Grove 7
Harworth Bircotes (town)21
Haughton 7
Hayton 7
Headon cum Upton 7
Hodsock 21
Holbeck  21
Laneham 7
Lound 7
Marnham 7
Mattersey 7
Misson 7
Misterton 7
Nether Langwith 21
Normanton on Trent 7
North and South Wheatley 7 
North Leverton with Habblesthorpe 7
Norton and Cuckney 21 
Ragnall 7
Rampton and Woodbeck 7 
Ranskill 7
Rhodesia 20
Saundby 7
Scaftworth 7
Scrooby 7
Shireoaks 20
South Leverton 7
Stokeham 7
Sturton le Steeple 7
Styrrup with Oldcotes 21
Sutton 7
Torworth 7
Treswell 7
Tuxford (town)7
Walkeringham 7
Wallingwells 21
Welbeck 21
West Burton 7
West Drayton 7
West Markham 7
West Stockwith 7
Wiseton 7

Broxtowe

Broxtowe borough: Part of the former Beeston and Stapleford Urban District is unparished.

Awsworth  2
Brinsley  2
Cossall  2
Eastwood (town)8
Greasley  2
Kimberley (town)2
Nuthall  2
Stapleford (town)3
Strelley  2
Trowell  2

Gedling
Gedling borough: Part of the former Arnold Urban District and Carlton Urban District are unparished.

Bestwood Village 2 
Burton Joyce  2
Calverton  2
Colwick 5
Lambley  2
Linby  2
Newstead  2
Papplewick  2
Ravenshead 2 16 
St Albans 2 
Stoke Bardolph  2
Woodborough 2

Mansfield
Mansfield district: The former Mansfield Municipal Borough and Mansfield Woodhouse Urban District are unparished.

Warsop 18

Newark and Sherwood

Newark and Sherwood district: The whole of the district is parished.

Alverton 14
Averham 16
Balderton 14
Barnby in the Willows 14
Bathley 16
Besthorpe 14
Bilsthorpe 16
Bleasby 16
Blidworth 16
Bulcote 16
Carlton on Trent 16
Caunton 16
Caythorpe 16
Clipstone 16
Coddington 14
Collingham 14
Cotham 14
Cromwell 16
Eakring 16
East Stoke 14
Edingley 16
Edwinstowe 16
Egmanton 16
Elston 14
Epperstone 16
Farndon 14
Farnsfield 16
Fernwood 14 
Fiskerton cum Morton 16
Girton 14
Gonalston 16
Grassthorpe 16
Gunthorpe 16
Halam 16
Halloughton 16
Harby 14
Hawton 14
Hockerton 16
Holme 14
Kelham 16
Kersall 16
Kilvington 14
Kings Clipstone
Kirklington 16
Kirton 16
Kneesall 16
Langford 14
Laxton and Moorhouse 16
Lindhurst 16
Lowdham 16
Maplebeck 16
Meering 14
Newark (town)13
North Clifton 14
North Muskham 16
Norwell 16
Ollerton and Boughton (town)16
Ompton 16
Ossington 16
Oxton 16
Perlethorpe cum Budby 16
Rainworth 16
Rolleston 16
Rufford 16
South Clifton 14
South Muskham 16
South Scarle 14
Southwell (town)16
Spalford 14
Staunton 14
Staythorpe 16
Sutton-on-Trent 16
Syerston 14
Thorney 14
Thorpe 14
Thurgarton 16
Upton 16
Walesby 16
Wellow 16
Weston 16
Wigsley 14
Winkburn 16
Winthorpe 14

Nottingham

Nottingham city: The former Nottingham County Borough is unparished.

Rushcliffe

Rushcliffe borough: The former West Bridgford Urban District is unparished.

Aslockton 4
Barton in Fabis 2
Bingham (town)4
Bradmore 2
Bunny 2
Car Colston 4
Clipston 4
Colston Bassett 4
Costock 2
Cotgrave (town)4
Cropwell Bishop 4
Cropwell Butler 4
East Bridgford 4
East Leake 2
Elton on the Hill 4
Flawborough 4
Flintham 4
Gamston 4
Gotham 2
Granby 4
Hawksworth 4
Hickling 4
Holme Pierrepont 4
Keyworth 4
Kingston on Soar 2
Kinoulton 4
Kneeton 4
Langar cum Barnstone 4
Newton 4 
Normanton on Soar 2
Normanton on the Wolds 4
Orston 4
Owthorpe 4
Plumtree 4
Radcliffe on Trent 4
Ratcliffe-on-Soar 2
Rempstone 2
Ruddington 2
Saxondale 4
Scarrington 4
Screveton 4
Shelford 4 
Shelton 4
Sibthorpe 4
Stanford on Soar 2
Stanton on the Wolds 4
Sutton Bonington 2
Thoroton 4
Thorpe in the Glebe 2
Thrumpton 2
Tithby 4
Tollerton 4
Upper Broughton 4
West Leake 2
Whatton-in-the-Vale 4
Widmerpool 4
Willoughby on the Wolds 2
Wiverton Hall 4
Wysall 2

Notes

 Formerly Arnold Urban District
 Formerly Basford Rural District
 Formerly Beeston and Stapleford Urban District
 Formerly Bingham Rural District
 Formerly Carlton Urban District
 Formerly East Retford Municipal Borough
 Formerly East Retford Rural District
 Formerly Eastwood Urban District
 Formerly Hucknall Urban District
 Formerly Kirkby in Ashfield Urban District
 Formerly Mansfield Municipal Borough
 Formerly Mansfield Woodhouse Urban District
 Formerly Newark Municipal Borough
 Formerly Newark Rural District
 Formerly Nottingham County Borough
 Formerly Southwell Rural District
 Formerly Sutton in Ashfield Urban District
 Formerly Warsop Urban District
 Formerly West Bridgford Urban District
 Formerly Worksop Municipal Borough
 Formerly Worksop Rural District

References

See also
 List of civil parishes in England

External links
 Office for National Statistics : Geographical Area Listings

Populated places in Nottinghamshire
Nottinghamshire
 
Parishes